The following is a list of events affecting Canadian television in 1971. Events listed include television show debuts, finales, cancellations, and channel launches.

Events

Debuts

Ending this year

Births 
19 July  – Alan Marriott, voice actor, writer, improv comedian and improv instructor

Television shows

1950s
Country Canada (1954–2007)
CBC News Magazine (1952–1981)
Chez Hélène (1959–1973)
Circle 8 Ranch (1955–1978)
The Friendly Giant (1958–1985)
Hockey Night in Canada (1952–present)
The National (1954–present)
Front Page Challenge (1957–1995)
Wayne and Shuster Show (1958–1989)

1960s
Audubon Wildlife Theatre (1968–1974)
CTV National News (1961–present)
Elwood Glover's Luncheon Date (1963–1975)
The Galloping Gourmet (1968–1972)
Land and Sea (1964–present)
Man Alive (1967–2000)
Mr. Dressup (1967–1996)
Music Hop (1962–1972)
The Nature of Things (1960–present, scientific documentary series)
The Pierre Berton Show (1962–1973)
The Pig and Whistle (1967–1977)
Question Period (1967–present, news program)
Reach for the Top (1961–1985)
Singalong Jubilee (1961–1974)
Take 30 (1962–1983)
Telescope (1963–1973)
The Tommy Hunter Show (1965–1992)
University of the Air (1966–1983)
W-FIVE (1966–present, newsmagazine program)

1970s
Drop-In (1970-1974)Here Come the Seventies (1970-1973)This Land (1970–1982)

TV moviesThe Megantic Outlaw''

Television stations

Debuts

See also
 1971 in Canada
 List of Canadian films

References